Joshua Granville Leonard (born June 17, 1975) is an American actor, writer, and director, known for his role in The Blair Witch Project (1999). He has since starred in films such as Madhouse (2004), The Shaggy Dog (2006), Higher Ground (2011), The Motel Life (2012), Snake and Mongoose (2013), If I Stay (2014), The Town That Dreaded Sundown (2014), 6 Years (2015), and Unsane (2018).

Early life
Leonard was born in Houston, Texas, the son of Joann, an author, and Robert Leonard, a theater professor at Pennsylvania State University. He was raised in State College, Pennsylvania. Leonard obtained his GED and at age 16 travelled to Chiapas, Mexico, where he taught at an elementary school and volunteered at an anthropological institute. Leonard then spent time in Seattle and London, where he developed an interest in photography, before settling in New York City at age 19. He is Jewish on his mother's side.

Career
In 1997, Leonard auditioned for and landed one of the three principal roles in the found footage horror film The Blair Witch Project. Although he reportedly only earned an initial salary of $500, the experience proved rewarding in other ways as the film combined acting and photography. The film premiered at the Sundance Film Festival. Leonard has since appeared in numerous films and television shows as an actor, including HBO's television film Live from Baghdad, the drama film Things Behind the Sun directed by Allison Anders, the comedy film The Shaggy Dog with Tim Allen, the drama film Men of Honor with Robert De Niro and Cuba Gooding, Jr., and the psychological thriller film Bitter Feast with Larry Fessenden.

In 2009, he starred in the Independent Spirit Award-winning film Humpday, for which he won Best Actor at the Gijón International Film Festival. Leonard has also appeared on the acclaimed HBO series Hung and the Showtime series United States of Tara. Leonard directed the short film The Youth in Us, which was shown at the 2005 Sundance Film Festival. Art documentary Beautiful Losers followed, winning the Grand Jury Prize at CineVegas in 2008. He has also directed music videos for many popular acts, such as Morcheeba, Harper Simon, and Fitz and the Tantrums, as well as teaching directing and acting at The New York Film Academy, UC Irvine, and Academia Internacional De Cinema in São Paulo, Brazil. In 2011, Leonard starred in Vera Farmiga's directorial debut drama film Higher Ground, playing a religious man at odds with his wife (Farmiga). He also co-wrote, directed and starred in The Lie, a devilish morality tale adapted from the story by acclaimed author T. C. Boyle. The project co-starred Mark Webber, Jess Weixler, and Jane Adams, and was well received by audiences and critics.

Leonard next appeared alongside Dakota Fanning in The Motel Life (2012). The following year, he starred alongside Carol Kane and Natasha Lyonne in the dark comedy film Clutter, and co-starred in the sports film Snake and Mongoose. In 2014, Leonard co-starred in the drama film If I Stay, directed by R. J. Cutler and based on the novel of the same name by Gayle Forman. Leonard was then cast in the third season of A&E's drama-thriller series Bates Motel as James Finnigan, a psychology professor and a love interest for Norma Louise Bates. In 2015, he had a co-starring role in the romantic drama film 6 Years, directed by Hannah Fidell, which premiered at South by Southwest. In December 2015, it was reported that Marisa Tomei and Timothy Olyphant would star in the Leonard-directed drama film Behold My Heart.

Personal life
In January 2015, Leonard announced his engagement to actress Alison Pill. They were married on May 24, 2015, in Los Angeles. In July 2016, Leonard and Pill announced they were expecting their first child, a girl. Their daughter, Wilder Grace Leonard, was born on November 19, 2016.

Filmography

Film

Television

Awards and nominations

References

External links

 
 
 

1975 births
20th-century American male actors
21st-century American male actors
American male television actors
American male film actors
Film directors from Texas
Living people
Male actors from Houston
Male actors from Pennsylvania
Montgomery College alumni
People from State College, Pennsylvania